Sindhu Rajasekaran is an Indian author and film maker. Her debut novel Kaleidoscopic Reflections was longlisted for the Crossword Book Award in 2011, while her prose and poetry have appeared in internationally acclaimed literary magazines. She co-founded an independent film production company, Camphor Cinema, and produced the critically acclaimed Indo-British feature film Ramanujan, based on the life and times of the mathematical genius Srinivasa Ramanujan.  Her second book is a collection of short stories titled So I Let It Be; it released in 2019.

Early life and education

Sindhu was born in Madras to IAS officer and Film Director Gnana Rajasekaran and Sakunthala Rajasekaran. She grew up in Kerala and Tamil Nadu. Trained as an Electronics and Communications Engineer at Anna University, Sindhu received a master's degree in English from the University of Edinburgh.

Literary works

Sindhu’s debut novel ‘‘Kaleidoscopic Reflections’’ was longlisted for the Crossword Book Award in 2011. The novel tells the tale of an inter-caste Tamil family, spanning five generations, and how their destiny is inextricably linked to the fate of India.

In her second book, So I Let It Be, the themes of love, loss of individuality, sexuality, and an overwhelmingly poignant and profound sense of saudade are explored. Stories from this collection have previously been featured in literary magazines. ‘‘The Sacred Cow’’ appeared in the internationally acclaimed Asia Literary Review. ‘‘The Routine’’ was published in Elsewhere Lit. Huffington Post listed this story among 14 contemporary short stories that will spark your mind. Her short story ‘‘Mountain of God’’ was published in Kitaab.

Sindhu's acclaimed third book, Smashing the Patriarchy, was published by Aleph Book Company in 2021.  Centred around the bold voices of millennials and Gen Zs, Smashing the Patriarchy explores how young Indian women from diverse backgrounds ingeniously overcome the patriarchy in their everyday lives.  

Her poems Meghdooth and Let Me Molest You have been published by Muse India as part of an anthology of poetry, and So I Let It Be and Mermaid were published in The Dance of the Peacock by Hidden Brook Press, Canada in 2013.

She has contributed articles on politics and culture to the Scottish magazine Bella Caledonia  and India’s Impact. She was one among the youngest writers invited to participate and speak at the Hyderabad Literary Festival in 2013.

Theatre and film

Sindhu co-wrote and acted in a play titled The Tiara Gynaelogues, staged at the Edinburgh Festival Fringe in 2011.

She performed spoken word for the premier performance groups Illicit Ink and Writers’ Bloc in the UK.

With Ramanujan Sindhu forayed into the world of screenwriting and film production; she is the Assistant Scriptwriter of the film and also the Producer of the film. She set up the production house, Camphor Cinema, with her husband in 2012.

Critically acclaimed, Ramanujan won an award for Best Production at Norway’s NTFF in 2015, the Ananda Vikadan Best Production Award and V4 Entertainers Film Awards. The Rashtrapati Bhavan invited Camphor Cinema to specially screen the film for the President of India, who felicitated the producers at the event

References

External links
 http://www.edinburghspotlight.com/2011/09/feature-illicit-ink/

1987 births
Living people
Screenwriters from Chennai
Women writers from Tamil Nadu
Women writers from Kerala